Dewey Lake, located near Prestonsburg, Kentucky in Floyd County, is part of the integrated flood reduction system operated by the United States Army Corps of Engineers for the entire Ohio River Basin.

The  lake was formed by impounding John's Creek in 1949, and was named for Admiral George Dewey.  Dewey Dam (National ID # KY03029) is an earthen dam, 118 feet high. The length of the lake is 18.5 miles upstream from the dam and its water shed covers 207 square miles.

Jenny Wiley State Resort Park is located on Dewey Lake.

Recreation
The largest tiger muskie ever taken in the state of Kentucky (13 lb., 12 oz.) was caught in Dewey Lake.

References

1949 establishments in Kentucky
Buildings and structures in Floyd County, Kentucky
Protected areas of Floyd County, Kentucky
Reservoirs in Kentucky
Dams in Kentucky
United States Army Corps of Engineers dams
Dams completed in 1949
Bodies of water of Floyd County, Kentucky